The Berger Picard or Picardy Shepherd, is a French herding dog originating in Picardy. These dogs nearly became extinct after both World War I and World War II and remain a rare breed.

Appearance 

The Berger Picard is a medium-sized, well-muscled dog, slightly longer than tall with a tousled yet elegant appearance. Their ears are naturally erect, high-set, and quite wide at the base. Their eyebrows are thick, but do not shield their dark frank eyes. They are known for their smile. Their natural tail normally reaches to the hock and is carried with a slight J-curve at the tip. Their weather-proof coat is harsh and crisp to the touch, not excessively long with a minimal undercoat. Coat colors fall into two colors, fawn and brindle, with a range of shade variations.

Temperament 
The Berger Picard's attributes include a lively, intelligent personality and a sensitive and assertive disposition that responds quickly to obedience training. Picards are easygoing and mellow but can be reserved towards strangers. They require a lot of socialization during the first two years of their lives.

Picards are energetic and hard working, alert, and are not excessive barkers. Some Picards are notoriously picky eaters.

The breed also has a well-developed sense of humor, making them an endearing companion, and they continue to be used very effectively as both sheep and cattle herders in their native land and elsewhere.

Like many herding breeds, Picards require human companionship. Since they can be demonstrative to their owners and enthusiastic towards other animals, formal obedience training and positive socialization is important.

Health 
Berger Picards are a relatively healthy breed. Known medical conditions include hip dysplasia and progressive retinal atrophy (PRA). A reputable breeder will have hips certified by the Orthopedic Foundation for Animals (OFA) or by PennHip with the results posted at the OFA database. Eyes will be certified for hereditary diseases through the OFA as well (previously through the Canine Eye Research Foundation) and results should also be published on the OFA database.

The Berger Picard participates in the Canine Health Information Center. To obtain a CHIC number, dogs must have their hips and eyes checked with the results published on the OFA website and their blood banked for DNA plus one elective, either elbows, thyroid, or heart evaluated.

The breed's life expectancy is 12 to 14 years.

Care

Exercise and activities 
The Berger Picard can compete in agility trials, tracking, obedience, showmanship, Schutzhund, flyball, lure coursing, French ring sport and herding events. Herding instincts and trainability can be measured at noncompetitive herding tests. Berger Picards exhibiting basic herding instincts can be trained to compete in herding trials.

Living conditions 
Despite being able and ready to work outdoors, Picards can do surprisingly well in city life provided they are given enough energy-releasing exercise. They are very loyal and enjoy a lot of attention and may suffer from separation anxiety (even if being left alone inside for short periods of time).  This is not a breed created to live outside year round. They lack the layer of body fat that even a lean Livestock Guardian Dog has, and their coat is not dense enough to withstand frigid winter conditions of many areas.

Grooming 
The Berger Picard is a low maintenance dog. The rough, tousled coat can mat if not brushed on a regular basis (once every other week), but the coat does not require special care to yield its rustic appearance.

Bathing is rarely done. Their fur should never be trimmed except possibly hand-stripping the ears. Picards have low oil content in their fur and therefore have little odor.

History 

In 2018 a genetic study found that, just prior to 1859, a broadly distributed European herding dog had given rise to the French Berger Picard, the German Shepherd Dog, and the five Italian herding breeds: the Bergamasco Shepherd, Cane Paratore, Lupino del Gigante, Pastore d'Oropa, and the Pastore della Lessinia e del Lagorai.

One author believes that the Berger Picard was brought to northern France and the Pas de Calais in the 9th century by the Franks. Some experts insist that this breed is related to the more well-known Briard and Beauceron, while others believe it shares a common origin with Dutch and Belgian Shepherds. Although the Berger Picard made an appearance at the first French dog show in 1863, the breed's rustic appearance did not lead to popularity as a show dog.

The breeding stock of the Berger Picard was decimated by the ravages of World War I and World War II. With its population concentrated on the farms of north-eastern France, trench warfare in the Somme reduced the breed to near extinction. The prevalence of the breed worldwide remains limited, even in its native country.

In France, there are approximately 3500 dogs. The Berger Picard was accepted by the Fédération Cynologique Internationale (FCI) in 1955.

Germany has approximately 500 of this breed. There are approximately 400 Berger Picards in the United States and Canada. The Berger Picard Club of America and the Berger Picard Club Canada were formed to help promote and protect this breed. The Berger Picard was fully recognized in the herding group by the American Kennel Club on 1 July 2015. It is also in the herding group category of the Canadian Kennel Club.

The interim breed standard for the Picardy Sheepdog was approved and the breed was accepted on to the import register of the United Kingdom's Kennel Club on 1 April 2014. The breed can only be shown in Import classes and is awaiting official registration of the proposed Picardy Sheepdog Club. The Picard was first shown at Crufts in March 2016 in the Pastoral (Herding) Group.

Recent history 
Berger Picards have been seen in at least three films: Daniel and the Superdogs (2004); Because of Winn-Dixie (2005); and Are We Done Yet? (2007). The producers of the American film Because of Winn-Dixie (2005) brought five Picards from Europe (three of the five actually performed: "Scott"; "Laiko"; and "Tasha"). The trainer wanted a dog that resembled the scruffy mutt on the original book's cover, but several were needed that looked alike so that production could continue smoothly, so he decided on this rare purebred dog from France. People often mistakenly think the on-screen "Winn-Dixie" was played by a mixed breed dog.

Joker passed away on 28 June 2021 after he collapsed and was rushed to the animal hospital. The autopsy revealed the splenic tumours, which weren't discovered earlier during the medical examination prior to his death.

See also 
 Dogs portal
 List of dog breeds

References

Further reading

External links 
 Berger Picard Club of America, official AKC Parent Club
 AKC Page for the Berger PIcard
 Les Amis du Berger Picard (French Website)
 Berger Picard Club Canada
 Picardy Sheepdog Club of the UK
 Kennel Club of the United Kingdom
 American Rare Breed Association

FCI breeds
Herding dogs
Dog breeds originating in France
Rare dog breeds